Irfan is an Indian actor who has appeared in Tamil films and television serials. He began his career with a Television serial Kana Kaanum Kaalangal, which gave him popularity among Tamil audience.

Personal life

Irfan was born in Madurai on 29 November 1985. He used to work as a server at a restaurant.

Career
Irfan Mohamed is a Tamil serial actor and model. He is widely known for his breakthrough role in Kanaa Kaanum Kaalangal where he played Vineeth. Subsequently, he got an opportunity to participate in the dance reality show Jodi Number One in STAR Vijay TV. He was paired up with Monisha, and he went on to capture the third place. His other co-stars from Kanaa Kaanum Kaalangal came together with him to make a movie Pattalam, before getting an opportunity to play a supporting role in the 2012 movie Eppadi Manasukkul Vanthai.

He was then called upon to play the lead role in the movie Sundaattam that revolved around the gambling form of carom, that was based in North Chennai. Post all these endeavors he was offered the role of Shakti Saravanan in the blockbuster Vijay TV serial Saravanan Meenatchi. He, however, left the serial in mid 2014, stating he lost interest.

Filmography

Films

Television

References

1989 births
Living people
Tamil male actors
Tamil male television actors
Television personalities from Tamil Nadu
Male actors from Chennai
Male actors in Tamil cinema
21st-century Tamil male actors
Tamil Reality dancing competition contestants